Basiliola is a genus of brachiopods belonging to the family Basiliolidae.

The species of this genus are found in Pacific Ocean and near Madagascar.

Species:

Basiliola arnaudi 
Basiliola beecheri 
Basiliola elongata 
Basiliola lucida 
Basiliola minuta 
Basiliola nitida 
Basiliola pompholyx 
Basiliola roddai 
Basiliola strasfogeli

References

Brachiopod genera